On 9 July 2010, a suicide bombing occurred in a market in Yakaghund, Mohmand Agency, in the Federally Administered Tribal Areas of Pakistan. At least 104 people were killed while more than 120 people were wounded. This was the last of a streak of attacks that was the record most major terrorist attacks (over 40 deaths) in a row in the Pakistan war on terrorism, with least 7 in a row, much more than the previous record of 2 which happened only 2 times; marking an escalating of the War on Terrorism in Pakistan.

Background
In late 2009 and early 2010, the Pakistani military had been engaged in a campaign to clear militants from the Mohmand Agency and the surrounding area, with the commander of forces in the area claiming that 80 percent of militants had been cleared as of September 2009. The area, which borders Kunar Province, Afghanistan, had been the scene of violence prior to the attack as a result of spillover from neighbouring Afghanistan and other areas of Pakistan.

Attack
The target of the attack was believed to be a meeting (jirga) of tribal elders near the local government headquarters. Tehrik-i-Taliban Pakistan claimed responsibility for the attack. According to a local Taliban spokesman, the meeting was targeted as it was convened to discuss a plan against the Taliban.

The attack was thought to be revenge for an offensive carried out by the Pakistani Army against militants in the tribal area. The blast caused significant damage to the market area, as well as to a local prison, from which several prisoners were able to escape through a wall which was partially destroyed.

Aftermath
The more seriously injured casualties were taken to hospital in Peshawar, the administrative centre of the tribal areas while the less seriously injured were treated in local hospitals. This was the deadliest attack in 2010 in Pakistan up till that time.

See also
List of terrorist incidents, 2010
List of terrorist incidents in Pakistan since 2001
Islamic terrorism
Terrorism in Pakistan

References

2010 murders in Pakistan
Islamic terrorist incidents in 2010
Mass murder in 2010
Suicide bombings in Pakistan
Terrorist incidents in Pakistan in 2010
Mohmand District
Crime in Khyber Pakhtunkhwa
Marketplace attacks in Asia